The gaper (Champsodon capensis) is a species of marine ray-finned fish a crocodile toothfish belonging to the family Champsodontidae. It is found in the Indian Ocean along the coast of East Africa from Kenya to South Africa and off the Seychelles and Mauritius. This species has entered the Mediterranean Sea, most likely as a Lessepsian migrant through the Suez Canal being first recorded in 2012. Gapers occur in large shoals which move from deep water to the surface at night.

References

grunter
Fish described in 1908